Peperomia galioides is a species of plant in the family Piperaceae, native to Mexico, Central America and South America. P. galioides has petioles of less than 1mm long and leaves between 5-30mm. There has been research in Colombia and Peru to know about the essential oils of this species. It was traditionally used in Peruvian herbal medicine.

References

galioides